Étauliers is a commune in the Gironde department in southwestern France.

Population

Twinning 
SInce January 2012, the commune of Étauliers has been twinned with Plougrescant, a commune in Côtes-d'Armor, Brittany.

See also
Communes of the Gironde department

References

Communes of Gironde